Eid is a former municipality in Møre og Romsdal county, Norway. The  municipality existed from 1874 until its dissolution in 1964. It was located along the Romsdalsfjorden in the north-central part of the present-day Rauma Municipality. The administrative centre and largest population centre was the village of Eidsbygda. The municipality then extended to the southeast to the coast of the Isfjorden.

History
The small municipality of Eid was established on 1 January 1874 when the old municipality of Eid og Voll was divided into Eid Municipality and Voll Municipality. Eid had an initial population of 1,048.  During the 1960s, there were many municipal mergers across Norway due to the work of the Schei Committee. On 1 January 1964, the municipality of Eid (population: 381) was merged with the neighboring municipalities of Voll (population: 1,163), Grytten (population: 3,683), Hen (population: 1,663), and the southern part of Veøy municipality (population: 1,400) to form the new Rauma Municipality.

Government
All municipalities in Norway, including Eid, are responsible for primary education (through 10th grade), outpatient health services, senior citizen services, unemployment and other social services, zoning, economic development, and municipal roads.  The municipality is governed by a municipal council of elected representatives, which in turn elects a mayor.

Municipal council
The municipal council  of Eid was made up of 13 representatives that were elected to four year terms.  The party breakdown of the final municipal council was as follows:

See also
List of former municipalities of Norway

References

Rauma, Norway
Former municipalities of Norway
1874 establishments in Norway
1964 disestablishments in Norway